Jade Goto (born 16 September 1981), better known by his stage name Jay'ed (stylised as JAY'ED), is a Japanese R&B singer-songwriter who debuted under Toy's Factory in 2007 and is most known for his single with Juju, "Ashita ga Kuru Nara" which sold over 140,000 copies.

Biography 
Jay'ed was born in 1981 in New Zealand to a Japanese father and a New Zealand mother of Samoan and Māori descent. He lived in New Zealand until he was 10, then moved to Minoh, Osaka. After deciding to become a singer, Jay'ed performed in the local Osaka club circuit. His first break into music was in 2002, when he appeared as a featured artist on a Sphere of Influence album track.

He debuted as an indie artist in 2005, with his first single "Why?". This was followed by a mini-album, Gift: Just Let Me Know, which sold over 20,000 copies. In 2008, he debuted as a major label artist on Toy's Factory with the single "Superwoman".

Jay'ed found his most success in 2009, after a duet singer Juju on the song "Ashita ga Kuru Nara," which was used as the theme song for the movie April Bride. It was a hit, reaching No. 2 on Oricon charts.

Jay'ed collaborated with Infinity 16 and Waka-danna from Shōnan no Kaze on the song . It was not successful in physical sales or airplay, but reached No. 1 on the RIAJ digital tracks chart for three weeks. This made Jay'ed the artist with the most weeks at No. 1 (6, including Ashita ga Kuru Nara's weeks); however in mid-2010 this record was beaten by Kana Nishino. Jay'ed's 6th single, "Everybody," was picked as the KDDI au CM song, a promotion giving Jay'ed his first top 20 solo single.

Discography

Albums

Collaborative albums

Best albums

Cover albums

Singles

As lead artist 

* established April 2009.

Digital Singles

As featured artist

Other appearances

Videography

As lead artist

As featured artist

References

External links 
 Official Website 
 

1981 births
Living people
Japanese-language singers
Japanese male musicians
Japanese male pop singers
Japanese songwriters
Japanese rhythm and blues singers
New Zealand Māori musicians
New Zealand people of Japanese descent
New Zealand people of Samoan descent
New Zealand songwriters
Male songwriters
People from Invercargill
People from Minoh, Osaka
Japanese people of Māori descent
Japanese people of Samoan descent
Toy's Factory artists
Musicians from Osaka Prefecture
LDH (company) artists
21st-century New Zealand male singers
21st-century Japanese male singers
21st-century Japanese singers